The Missouri Conservationist is a monthly periodical published by the Missouri Department of Conservation.  It was first published in 1938 by the department's predecessor, the Missouri Conservation Commission.  The magazine focuses on educating the general public on issues pertaining to the conservation and management of Missouri’s natural resources.

The magazine is free to all residents of the State of Missouri. The cost of its production and postage is supported by a portion of the statewide conservation sales tax. Non-residents can subscribe for a fee. All issues since July 1995 are published online by the Missouri Department of Conservation. Angie Daly Morfeld is the editor as of July 2017. The magazine has an ISSN number of 0026-6515.

List of editors 

Townsend Godsey (1938–1941)
Harold W Clover (1941–1943)
 Charles H Callison (1943–1947)
 Dan Saults (1947–1957)
 Jim Keefe (1957–1985)
 Mac Johnson (1985–1989)
 Kathy Love (1989–1997)
 Tom Cwynar (1997–2005)
 Ara Clark (2005–2014)
 Nichole LeClair (2014–2015)
 Angie Daly Morfeld (2015–present)

References

External links

Missouri Conservationist from the Missouri Digital Heritage, published by the Secretary of State of Missouri
Missouri Conservationist in Internet Archive.

1938 establishments in Missouri
Lifestyle magazines published in the United States
Monthly magazines published in the United States
Environmental magazines
Hunting and fishing magazines
Magazines established in 1938
Magazines published in Missouri
Wildlife magazines